Dannyjo Cox (born 30 July 1992) is an English cricketer. Cox is a right-handed batsman who fields occasionally as a wicket-keeper.  He was born in Wolverhampton, Staffordshire.

While studying for his degree in Mathematics and Sport Science at Loughborough University, Cox made his first-class debut for Loughborough MCCU against Northamptonshire in 2011.  He made a further first-class appearance in 2011, against Leicestershire.  His two first-class appearances have so far seen him score 32 runs at an average of 8.00, with a high score of 18.

He is now club captain at Old Hill Cricket Club in the Birmingham and District Premier League. He has also represented Herefordshire County Cricket Club averaging 39.92 with the bat in all competitions over 3 seasons (2011-2014).

References

External links
Dannyjo Cox at ESPNcricinfo
Dannyjo Cox at CricketArchive

1992 births
Living people
Cricketers from Wolverhampton
Alumni of Loughborough University
English cricketers
Loughborough MCCU cricketers
Herefordshire cricketers
Herefordshire cricket captains